Luther Ernest Barnhardt (November 29, 1903 – June 1, 1980) was an American politician who served as the 23rd lieutenant governor of North Carolina from 1957 to 1961 under Governor Luther H. Hodges.

Barnhardt was born in Concord, North Carolina, November 29, 1903. He was an attorney and a member of the North Carolina Senate (1945–56).  Barnhardt was elected lieutenant governor in 1956 and, by the state constitution of that time, was not eligible for re-election.  Barnhardt died June 1, 1980, and is buried at Carolina Memorial Park, Concord, North Carolina.

External links

Lieutenant Governors of North Carolina
Democratic Party North Carolina state senators
1903 births
1980 deaths
People from Concord, North Carolina
20th-century American politicians